Thor Chuan Leong (born 24 March 1988) is a Malaysian former professional snooker player. He is commonly referred to as Rory Thor.

Career
Thor, based in Penang, Malaysia represented his country at the 2006 & 2010 Asian Games and in the 2013 Asian Indoor and Martial Arts Games and 2013 Southeast Asian Games, in the Southeast Asian Games he won bronze in the snooker singles and doubles and gold in the six red snooker singles.

In 2014, Thor won the ACBS Asian Snooker Championship in May, beating Taiwan's Hung Chuang Ming 7–3 in the final. This victory gained Thor a two-year card on the professional World Snooker Tour for the 2014–15 and 2015/2016 seasons. However, despite the tour starting in May, Thor did not start playing on the tour until February 2015. He played in the Six-red World Championship, but lost all five of his group matches. In his first match in a ranking event qualifier he was beaten 1–4 by Dechawat Poomjaeng. Although Thor lost all four of his matches this season he did push top 16 player Stuart Bingham to a deciding frame in the first round of the Welsh Open.

Thor again failed to win a single match in ranking events during the 2015–16 season; in contrast, he performed successfully in the European Tour events, winning all of his first-round matches and reaching last 16 twice, at the Paul Hunter Classic and the Gdynia Open. As a result, Thor was able to secure his place on the Main Tour for two further seasons by finishing tied 31st on the Order of Merit.

A 5–2 victory over Jack Lisowski saw Thor qualify for the 2016 World Open and he reached the second round by beating Luca Brecel 5–3, before losing 1–5 to Neil Robertson. He also advanced to the last 32 of the Gibraltar Open with wins over Matthew Roberts and Gary Wilson, but lost 3–4 to Igor Figueiredo.

Performance and rankings timeline

Career finals

Pro-am finals: 3 (2 titles)

Amateur finals: 2 (1 title)

References

External links

Thor Chuan Leong at worldsnooker.com

1988 births
Place of birth unknown
Living people
Malaysian people of Chinese descent
Malaysian snooker players
Cue sports players at the 2006 Asian Games
Cue sports players at the 2010 Asian Games
Southeast Asian Games gold medalists for Malaysia
Southeast Asian Games silver medalists for Malaysia
Southeast Asian Games bronze medalists for Malaysia
Southeast Asian Games medalists in cue sports
Competitors at the 2007 Southeast Asian Games
Competitors at the 2009 Southeast Asian Games
Competitors at the 2011 Southeast Asian Games
Competitors at the 2013 Southeast Asian Games
Competitors at the 2015 Southeast Asian Games
Competitors at the 2017 Southeast Asian Games
Asian Games competitors for Malaysia